Caecum cooperi, common name the Cooper's Atlantic caecum, is a species of minute sea snail, a marine gastropod mollusk or micromollusk in the family Caecidae.

Distribution

Description
The maximum recorded shell length is 6.1 mm.

Habitat
Minimum recorded depth is 0 m. Maximum recorded depth is 73 m.

References

External links

Caecidae
Gastropods described in 1860
Taxa named by Sidney Irving Smith